Tenakee Springs is a city on Chichagof Island in Hoonah-Angoon Census Area, Alaska, United States. At the 2010 census the population was 131, up from 104 at the 2000 census.

Geography

Demographics

Tenakee Springs first appeared on the 1910 U.S. Census as the unincorporated village of "Tenakee." It reported under that name until 1940. From 1950-onwards, it reported under its present name of Tenakee Springs. It formally incorporated in 1971.

As of the census of 2000, there were 104 people, 59 households, and 28 families residing in the city. The population density was 7.5 people per square mile (2.9/km2). There were 144 housing units at an average density of 10.4 per square mile (4.0/km2). The racial makeup of the city was 87.50% White, 2.88% Native American, 0.96% Asian, 0.96% Pacific Islander, 1.92% from other races, and 5.77% from two or more races. 2.88% of the population were Hispanic or Latino of any race.

There were 59 households, out of which 16.9% had children under the age of 18 living with them, 39.0% were married couples living together, 5.1% had a female householder with no husband present, and 52.5% were non-families. 47.5% of all households were made up of individuals, and 13.6% had someone living alone who was 65 years of age or older. The average household size was 1.76 and the average family size was 2.46.

In the city, the age distribution of the population shows 13.5% under the age of 18, 5.8% from 18 to 24, 23.1% from 25 to 44, 42.3% from 45 to 64, and 15.4% who were 65 years of age or older. The median age was 47 years. For every 100 females, there were 121.3 males. For every 100 females age 18 and over, there were 109.3 males.

The median income for a household in the city was $33,125, and the median income for a family was $41,250. Males had a median income of $38,125 versus $26,250 for females. The per capita income for the city was $20,482. There were 9.1% of families and 11.8% of the population living below the poverty line, including 10.0% of under eighteens and 33.3% of those over 64.

Transportation
Tenakee Springs is served by the Tenakee Seaplane Base and Alaska Marine Highway.

Education
The Chatham School District operates the Tenakee Springs School, a school building used to support homeschooling families. In periods prior to 2016 it was a full-service school.

References

External links
 

Cities in Alaska
Cities in Hoonah–Angoon Census Area, Alaska
Populated coastal places in Alaska on the Pacific Ocean